was a feudal domain under the Tokugawa shogunate of Edo period Japan, located in Tsuga District of Shimotsuke Province (modern-day Tochigi Prefecture), Japan. It was centered on Mibu Castle in what is now part of the town of Mibu, Tochigi. Mibu was ruled through much of its history by a branch of the fudai Torii clan.

History
The Mibu clan, which had ruled this area since the Muromachi period was destroyed at the Battle of Odawara in 1590, and their lands came under the control of the Yūki clan. After the Battle of Sekigahara,  Tokugawa Ieyasu assigned a 19,000 koku holding in this area to Hineno Yoshiaki, formerly of Takashima Domain in Shinano Province in 1602. Hineno was instrumental in the construction of the Nikkō Tōshō-gū complex, and was rewarded for his efforts in 1634 by a transfer to Funai Domain (20,000 koku).

Mibu was assigned to Abe Tadaaki, who has served as a Rōjū to Shōgun Tokugawa Iemitsu, with revenues raised to 25,000 koku. He was reassigned in 1639 to Oishi Domain in Musashi Province. 

Mibu then came under the control of the Miura clan, for three generations, until the transfer of wakadoshiyori Miura Akihiro to Nobeoka Domain in 1692.

Shōgun Tokugawa Tsunayoshi then assigned the domain to Matsudaira Terusada, with an increase in size to 32,000 koku, and then 42,000 koku; however, he remained for only 3 years until his reassignment to Takasaki Domain. The domain was then reduced back to 25,000 koku and given to Katō Akihide, also a former wakadoshiyori, who made many attempts to reform the domain’s finances and administration. After his son, Katō Yoshinori was transferred to Minakuchi Domain in 1712, Mibu came under the control of the Torii clan, who then ruled until the Meiji Restoration.

The 6th daimyō, Torii Tadatomi, sided with the Satchō Alliance in the Boshin War of the Meiji Restoration, and fought in the Battle of Aizu, despite considerable opposition within the ranks of his samurai. The final daimyō, Torii Tadafumi was later raised to the rank of viscount in the kazoku peerage system, and served as the Japanese consul to the Kingdom of Hawaii.

After the abolition of the han system in July 1871, Mibu Domain became part of Tochigi Prefecture. The domain had a samurai-class population of 1693 people in 437 households, per a census in 1870.

Holdings at the end of the Edo period
As with most domains in the han system, Mibu Domain consisted of several discontinuous territories calculated to provide the assigned kokudaka, based on periodic cadastral surveys and projected agricultural yields. 

Shimotsuke Province
38 villages in Tsuga District
Shimōsa Province
1 village in Katsushika District
4 villages in Sashima District
15 villages in Yuki District
Yamato Province
4 villages in Katsuge District
Harima Province
25 villages in Mino District
4 villages in Kato District

List of daimyōs

References

Bolitho, Harold. (1974). Treasures among men; the fudai daimyo in Tokugawa Japan. New Haven: Yale University Press.
Kodama Kōta 児玉幸多, Kitajima Masamoto 北島正元 (1966). Kantō no shohan 関東の諸藩. Tokyo: Shin Jinbutsu Ōraisha.

External links
 "Mibu" at Edo 300

Notes

Domains of Japan
1601 establishments in Japan
States and territories established in 1601
1871 disestablishments in Japan
States and territories disestablished in 1871
Shimotsuke Province
History of Tochigi Prefecture
Abe clan
Ōkōchi-Matsudaira clan
Torii clan